Sabrina Anne Lloyd (born November 20, 1970) is an American retired film and television actress. She is known for portraying Wade Welles in the science fiction series Sliders, Natalie Hurley in the ABC sitcom Sports Night and Kelly in Father Hood (1993).

Early life
Sabrina Lloyd was born in Fairfax County, Virginia, and raised in Mount Dora, Florida. She is the daughter of Judy Lloyd, who managed a title insurance company in Lake Mary. At age 12, she began her acting career in the role of Pepper in a Mount Dora production of Annie.

When she was in the 10th grade she participated in a student exchange program that allowed her to spend a year in Brisbane, Queensland, Australia. While there, she was a full-time student at Pine Rivers High School. She graduated from Lake Mary High School in 1989.

Career
Returning to the United States, Lloyd continued to perform in local theater such as the Baystreet Players in Eustis and the Ice House Theater in Mount Dora, appearing in productions of Grease, Crimes of the Heart, and The Wizard of Oz. Lloyd moved to New York when she was 18 to pursue a film career. Her earliest work there was in industrial training films and TV commercials, including one for Eastpak backpacks. She made a guest appearance on an episode of Law & Order called "Intolerance". She signed with a new talent agent and started getting more roles in TV and film.

Her first important role in feature films was in Chain of Desire, and this was followed by her first starring role in Father Hood with Patrick Swayze. She appeared in the 1993 music video for the song "Iris" by The Breeders. Lloyd also made appearances on television, starring in the TV movies The Coming Out of Heidi Leiter, an episode of Lifestories: Families in Crisis and Love Off Limits.

In 1995, Lloyd played Wade Welles, one of the original four characters in the sci-fi TV show Sliders. In 1997, the show was picked up by the Sci Fi Channel, but Lloyd's contract was not renewed. She quickly landed a co-starring role as senior associate producer Natalie Hurley in the ABC sitcom Sports Night. 

In 2005, she starred as Terry Lake on the television show Numb3rs, but she left after the first season. In 2008, Lloyd was the lead actress in the independent film Universal Signs.

Personal life
Outside of her acting career, she is an artist and has explored various mediums such as writing, painting and pottery. She has two cats named Lucy and Theodore and was a vegetarian for six years during the 1990s. In 2010, Lloyd studied creative writing at Columbia University.

In April 1997, Lloyd married Ross Smith. They lived in Uganda for two years (2009–2010), and adopted a little girl while living there. They moved to Italy and lived in Rome for four years, where they had a son, and subsequently relocated to Vancouver Island. Lloyd is retired from acting.

Filmography

Film

Television

References

External links
 

1970 births
Living people
20th-century American actresses
21st-century American actresses
Actresses from Virginia
American film actresses
American stage actresses
American television actresses
Actors from Fairfax, Virginia
People from Eustis, Florida